The legislative districts of Isabela are the representations of the province of Isabela and the independent component city of Santiago in the various national legislatures of the Philippines. The province and the city are currently represented in the lower house of the Congress of the Philippines through their first, second, third, fourth, fifth, and sixth congressional districts.

History 
The province was represented as a lone legislative district until 1972. It was part of the representation of Region II from 1978 to 1984, and from 1984 to 1986, it elected 3 assemblymen at-large. In 1986, it was redistricted into four legislative districts.

On September 27, 2018, President Rodrigo Duterte signed Republic Act No. 11080, increasing the legislative districts from four to six and reapportioned the district assignments of cities and municipalities.

Six Districts (2019-Present)

1st District 
City: Ilagan
Municipalities: Cabagan, Delfin Albano, Divilacan, Maconacon, San Pablo, Santa Maria, Santo Tomas, Tumauini
Population (2020): 399,196

2nd District 
Municipalities: Benito Soliven, Gamu, Naguilian, Palanan,  Reina Mercedes, San Mariano
Population (2020): 199,903

3rd District 

Municipalities: Alicia, Angadanan, Cabatuan, Ramon, San Mateo
Population (2020): 282,027

4th District 
City: Santiago
Municipalities: Cordon, Dinapigue, Jones, San Agustin
Population (2020): 268,602

5th District 
Municipalities: Aurora, Burgos, Luna, Mallig, Quezon, Quirino, Roxas, San Manuel
Population (2020): 267,550

6th District 
City: Cauayan
Municipalities: Echague, San Guillermo, San Isidro
Population (2020): 279,772

Four Districts (1987-2019)

1st District 
City: Ilagan (became a city in 2012)
Municipalities: Cabagan, Delfin Albano, Divilacan, Maconacon, Palanan, San Pablo, Santa Maria, Santo Tomas, Tumauini

2nd District 
Municipalities: Aurora, Benito Soliven, Burgos, Gamu, Mallig, Naguilian, Quezon, Quirino, Roxas, San Manuel, San Mariano

3rd District 
City: Cauayan (became a city in 2001)
Municipalities: Alicia, Angadanan, Cabatuan, Luna, Reina Mercedes, San Guillermo, San Mateo

4th District 
City: Santiago (became a city in 1994)
Municipalities: Cordon, Dinapigue, Echague, Jones, Ramon, San Agustin, San Isidro

Notes

Lone District (defunct) 

Notes

At-Large (defunct)

1943–1944

1984–1986

References 

Isabela
Politics of Isabela (province)